Chempanoda/Chempanod is a village towards the north east of Kozhikode district of Kerala in India.  This place lies adjacent to the tourist spot Peruvannamuzhi . 
Chempanoda is a tourist spot. This village is surrounded by two rivers and there are mountains to the east (Western Ghats). 
People here are mainly into farming business and are planters of rubber trees, coconut trees, areca nut trees etc. The road through the village leads to another village named Poozhithode which is a hilly area of reserved forests..

Tourist spots

Peruvannamoozhi Dam and Surrounding areas (within 5 km from Chempanoda)
Peruvannamoozhy, a scenic village located 60 km Kozhikode city, Kerala has been included in the list of eco-tourism destinations in Kerala with the Tourism Minister inaugurating the eco-tourism project here on 10 August 2008.

An ecological hotspot in the Western Ghats, the eco tourism destination of Peruvannamoozhy is home to over 680 species of rare plants. The facilities available here include wild animal rehabilitation centre, bird sanctuary, crocodile farm, snake park, spice garden, trekking and boating. The reservoir here provides facilities for speedboat and rowboat cruises. There is a garden called Smaraka Thottam, which is built in the memory of the freedom fighters of the region. Uninhabited islands add to the charm of the place.

In additional to the natural environment, the irrigation dam and the garden nearby are added attractions. As part of eco tourism initiatives, the following facilities have been created: 
 Animal rehabilitation centre
 Bathing facility in river
 Bird sanctuary
 Snake park
 Trekking programmes
 Bamboo rafting 
 speedboat and rowboat cruises

The Peruvannamuzhi Dam is located 60 km from the Kozhikode city. You could reach here by private bus or by taxi.

There is no particular season to come Peruvannamuzhi Dam. But it would be better to come here in summer seasons (Mar-May) for boat riding. You should also reach here before 6pm since the Peruvannamuzhi Dam closes by 6pm. The Peruvannamuzhi Dam is also close on national holidays and Sundays.

 Crocodile farm (within 5 km from Chempanoda)
 Janakikadu (within 5 km from Chempanoda)
Janakikadu is a thick forest which attracts thousands of tourists every year. There is a wide variety of birds in this forest. An ecological hotspot in the Western Ghats, the eco tourism destination of Janakikadu is home to over 680 species of rare plants.

 Pottiyapara (within 5 km from Chempanoda)
This region offers immense scope for picnicking and Trekking programmes. The there is a scenic view of the valley from the top of Pottiyapara.

Climate 
Chempanoda has a generally humid tropical climate with a very hot season extending from March to May. The average annual rainfall is more than 3500 mm.this is one of the highest rain fall region in Calicut district.

Demographics 
Christians constitute majority of the population, followed by Muslim and Hindu communities respectively. The majority of the inhabitants are successors of the Syrian Christians of Central Kerala who migrated to Northern Kerala by the Malabar Migration.

Nearest towns
 Kuttiyadi
 Perambra
 Vatakara
 Kozhikode

Nearest villages
 Poozhithode
 Maruthonkara
 Mullankunnu

Transportation
Chempanoda village connects to other parts of India through Vatakara town on the west and Kuttiady town on the east.  National highway No.66 passes through Vatakara and the northern stretch connects to Goa and Mumbai.  The southern stretch connects to Cochin and Trivandrum.  The eastern National Highway No.54 going through Kuttiady connects to Mananthavady, Mysore and Bangalore. The nearest airports are at Kannur and Kozhikode.  The nearest railway station is at Vatakara. Proposed WAYANAD hairpin less road is passing through chempanoda.

References

Kuttiady area